The Return is the third studio album by American R&B artist Ruben Studdard and was released on October 17, 2006, by J Records. The first single, "Change Me", was released on July 31, 2006. The album was met with mixed reviews from critics who complained about the production and Ruben's performance. The Return debuted and peaked at number 8 but sales were low and it was the last album that Ruben released under J Records.

Controversy
Sony Music was accused of the unauthorized use of Louis Vuitton's copyrighted Toile as part of the disc's design. An undisclosed settlement was reached between Sony and LVMH, the parent company of Louis Vuitton.

Critical reception

The album received mixed reviews from music critics. AllMusic senior editor Stephen Thomas Erlewine found Studdard's performance throughout the album to be lazy with no melodies guiding him, concluding that "when combined with the dull productions, the results are deadly boring." About.com's Mark Edward Nero was also critical of Studdard's voice, saying that it had "no potency much of the time and almost sounds as generic as the vocals that accompany elevator music." Jody Rosen of Entertainment Weekly was more positive, saying that "The production's bland, but his sweet singing carries the day."

Commercial performance
The album debuted and peaked at number eight in the Billboard 200, with 71,000 copies sold in its first week of release. The album sold only 237,000 copies in the U.S. It subsequently became his last album with J Records, having been dropped from their line-up in December 2007.

Track listing

 (co.) Co-producer

Notes
Track 2, "Change Me", features additional background vocals by Steve Russell and Tank
Track 4, "Get U Loose", features additional background vocals by Steve Russell and Tank
Track 8, "Ain't No Party", features additional background vocals by Mocha

Sample credits
"The Return (Of the Velvet Teddy Bear)", samples "You're The Reason Why", performed by The Ebonys, written by Kenneth Gamble and Leon Huff
"Listen to Ya Heart", contains a portion of "Foe tha Love of $", performed by Bone Thugs-n-Harmony featuring Eazy-E, written by Bone Thugs-n-Harmony and Eazy-E

Personnel
Adapted from The Return liner notes.

 Chris Gehringer: mastering (Sterling Sound, NYC)
 Anita Marisa Boriboon: art direction and design
 Christian Lantry: photographer
 Vincent "VJ" Lake: stylist
 Mylah Morales: grooming
 Chris LeBeau: photoshoot production
 Bre Scullark: cover model

Charts

References

2006 albums
Ruben Studdard albums
J Records albums
19 Recordings albums
Albums produced by Scott Storch
Albums produced by Stargate
Albums produced by the Underdogs (production team)